The Ministry for Primary Industries (MPI) is the public service department of New Zealand charged with overseeing, managing and regulating the farming, fishing, food, animal welfare, biosecurity, and forestry sectors of New Zealand's primary industries.

History 
Formed in April 2012, MPI is a merger of the Ministry of Agriculture and Forestry (MAF), the Ministry of Fisheries (MFish), and the New Zealand Food Safety Authority (NZFSA).

At the 2017 general election, Labour campaigned on disestablishing the Ministry and restoring the previous agencies. However, MPI was not disestablished; instead, it was restructured with Fisheries New Zealand, Forestry New Zealand, Biosecurity New Zealand and New Zealand Food Safety established as new business groups within the larger agency, alongside an agriculture and investment services unit.

Te Uru Rākau, the New Zealand Forest Service, was re-established in May 2018 after its 1987 disestablishment. It is based in Rotorua.

Structure 
The Ministry is structured into eight sections. Each section is led by a deputy director-general.

 Biosecurity New Zealand
 Fisheries New Zealand
 New Zealand Food Safety
 Agriculture and Investment Services
 Te Uru Rākau (New Zealand Forest Service)
 Policy and Trade
 Public Affairs
 China Relations
 Corporate Services

Ministers
The Ministry serves 6 portfolios, 4 ministers, an associate minister and a parliamentary under-secretary.

List of Ministers for Primary Industries

See also
Biosecurity in New Zealand
National Animal Identification and Tracing 
Regulation of animal research in New Zealand

References

External links

Primary Industries
Primary Industries
2012 establishments in New Zealand
New Zealand
Forestry in New Zealand